Schweik in Civilian Life (Czech: Švejk v civilu) is a 1927 Czech-Austrian silent comedy film directed by Gustav Machatý and starring Karel Noll, Dina Gralla and Albert Paulig. It is a sequel to the 1926 film The Good Soldier Schweik.

The film's sets were designed by the art directors Vilém Rittershain, Hans Ledersteger and Alois Mecera. Location shooting took place in Vienna, Karlovy Vary and Prague.

Cast
 Karel Noll as Josef Švejk 
 Dina Gralla as Anička, Foster-child 
 Jiří Hron as Pavel 
 Albert Paulig as Baron Camra 
 Renati Renée as Dancer Lo 
 Jan Richter as Žížala 
 Josef Rovenský as Pižla 
 Robert Ford as Hotel Manager 
 Jindřich Fiala as Referee

References

Bibliography 
 Taylor, Richard. The BFI companion to Eastern European and Russian cinema. BFI, 2000.

External links 
 

1927 films
Czech silent films
Czech comedy films
Austrian silent films
Austrian comedy films
1927 comedy films
1920s Czech-language films
Films directed by Gustav Machatý
Czech black-and-white films
Czech sequel films
The Good Soldier Švejk
Films based on Czech novels
Films based on works by Jaroslav Hašek